Mark Gale (born 7 May 1976) is a former Australian rules footballer who played in the Australian Football League (AFL). He played for both the Fremantle Football Club and the St Kilda Football Club, mainly as a wingman.

He was first drafted from Claremont in the West Australian Football League as a foundation selection in the 1994 AFL Draft, before being delisted at the end of the 2000 season. St Kilda then selected him with the 64th selection of the 2001 AFL Draft.

Gale struggled to break into the Fremantle side, playing only five games in the club's first two seasons, before establishing himself in the team during the 1997 season.  He would play all 22 games in the 1998 season, before injuries and poor form saw him delisted at the end of the 2000 season.  He played just the single season at the Saints before retiring from football at the end of 2001.

He is the son of professional golfer Terry Gale and married to former Channel 9 Perth reporter and current Real Estate agent Kate Gale in 2001. He is currently employed at Scotch College in Perth.

References

External links

1976 births
Fremantle Football Club players
St Kilda Football Club players
Claremont Football Club players
Living people
People educated at Scotch College, Perth
Australian rules footballers from Western Australia
Western Australian State of Origin players